Leontius served as Greek Patriarch of Alexandria between 1052 and 1059.

References
 

11th-century Patriarchs of Alexandria
Melkites in the Fatimid Caliphate